Puppis A (Pup A) is a supernova remnant (SNR) about 100 light-years in diameter and roughly 6500–7000 light-years distant.  Its apparent angular diameter is about 1 degree. The light of the supernova explosion reached Earth approximately 3700 years ago.  Although it overlaps the Vela Supernova Remnant, it is four times more distant.

A hypervelocity neutron star known as the Cosmic Cannonball has been found in this SNR.

Puppis X-1
Puppis X-1 (Puppis A) was discovered by a Skylark flight in October 1971, viewed for 1 min with an accuracy ≥ 2 arcsec, probably at 1M 0821-426, with Puppis A (RA 08h 23m 08.16s Dec -42° 41′ 41.40″) as the likely visual counterpart.

Puppis A is one of the brightest X-ray sources in the X-ray sky. Its X-ray designation is 2U 0821-42.

Gallery

References

"Puppis A: Chandra Reveals Cloud Disrupted By Supernova Shock", Chandra: NASA/CXC/GSFC/U.Hwang et al.; ROSAT: NASA/GSFC/S.Snowden et al., 
 Simbad

See also
 List of supernova remnants

Supernova remnants
Puppis